Barry Davis may refer to:

Barry Davis (footballer) (born 1943), Australian rules footballer
Barry Davis (wrestler) (born 1961), American amateur wrestler
Barry Davis (baseball), American baseball coach
Barry Davis (sportscaster) (born 1968), Canadian sportscaster
Barry R. Davis, American biostatistician

See also
Barry Davies (disambiguation)